The 1918 SAPFL Grand Final was an Australian rules football game contested between the West Torrens Football Club and the West Adelaide Football Club, held at Jubilee Oval on Saturday 9 October 1918. It was the 3rd Grand Final of the South Australian Patriotic Football League, staged to determine the premiers of the 1918 SAPFL season. The match was won by West Torrens by a margin of 14 points, marking that clubs first patriotic premiership victory.

The SAFL was opposed to the formation of the Patriotic League and refused to recognise it during and after World War I.

References 

SAPFL Grand Final, 1918